Morris I. Leibman (died April 21, 1992) was an American attorney. He was a partner at Sidley Austin and the founder of a Chicago-based think tank called the National Strategy Forum. He graduated from the University of Chicago Law School in 1933. He served as a civilian aide-at-large to the United States Secretary of the Army from 1964 to 1979, and he was awarded the Presidential Medal of Freedom by President Ronald Reagan in 1981.

References

1992 deaths
People from Chicago
20th-century American lawyers
Presidential Medal of Freedom recipients